Mount Pleasant National Scenic Area is a federally designated National Scenic Area within George Washington National Forest in Virginia, USA, to the north of Lynchburg. The  scenic area is administered by the U.S. Forest Service. The scenic area includes a portion of the Appalachian Trail, which crosses Cole Mountain and Bald Knob. The area also includes Mount Pleasant and Pompey Mountain. The area was designated a scenic area as an alternative to federal wilderness designation. 

The National Scenic Area was established in 1994.

References

George Washington and Jefferson National Forests
National scenic areas
Protected areas of Virginia
Protected areas established in 1994